The Dead Sea Scrolls and the Christian myth is a 1979 book about the Dead Sea Scrolls, Essenes and early Christianity that proposes the non-existence of Jesus Christ. It was written by John Marco Allegro (1922–1988).

Content
The book was written nine years after Allegro's forced resignation from academia due to publishing The Sacred Mushroom and the Cross. It is an imaginative look at what life would have been like at Qumran, Palestine at the time when Jesus was supposed to have lived in the 1st century CE.

The book's aim was to show the logical progression of Jewish history through the writings and archaeology of Qumran, as opposed to the (unique) revelation of traditional Christianity. Allegro suggested that traditional Christianity developed through a literal misinterpretation of symbolic narratives found in the scrolls by writers who did not understand the minds of the Essenes. He further argued that Gnostic Christianity developed directly from the Essenes and that Jesus Christ was a fictional character based on a real person, who had helped established the Essene movement (or "Way") and lived in the 1st century BCE, around one hundred years before the traditional period of New Testament events. In a chapter entitled "Will the real Jesus Christ please stand up," Allegro referred to this man as the Teacher of Righteousness.

Allegro argued that the word Essenes signified "healers" and that the Essenes had inherited a lore of healing with plants and stones that had been passed down from the "fallen angels" that arrived on Mount Hermon mentioned in the Book of Enoch. He presumed their establishment of Qumran complex by the Dead Sea was related to the interpretation and anticipation of a prophecy about the Teacher of Righteousness, a "man whose appearance was like the appearance of bronze, with a line of flax and a measuring rod in his hand," who was to somehow create lifegiving waters to flow into the Dead Sea from a temple in some northern location.

Reaction
The book received widespread criticism from the academic community: numerous rebuttals were published, and other members of the team pointed out the problems with Allegro's arguments. Randall Price called Allegro "the father of scroll sensationalists" for his interpretations of the scrolls. Allegro believed that there was a conspiracy to prevent publication of the scrolls because they could damage the image of Jesus, which was later repeated by conspiracy theory writers such as Richard Leigh and Michael Baigent in their book The Dead Sea Scrolls Deception.

Allegro's theories about the relationship of the scrolls to Jesus were widely rejected and led to his rapid downfall. Allegro had previously published The Sacred Mushroom and the Cross in 1970, with even more theories about Jesus. Allegro was heavily criticized by many scholars, including his own mentor at Oxford, and his publisher issue an apology. Allegro's scholarly reputation was destroyed, and he had to resign from his academic position.

See also
 James the Brother of Jesus (book)
 The Passover Plot

References

External links
 johnallegro.org The Dead Sea Scrolls and the Christian Myth, 1979

1979 non-fiction books
British non-fiction books
English non-fiction books
Books critical of Christianity
Historical revisionism
Dead Sea Scrolls
Works about the Christ myth theory